A gender identity clinic is a type of specialist clinic providing services relating to transgender health care.

List of clinics and hospitals

Asia

Hong Kong 
 Gender Identity Clinic at the Prince of Wales Hospital in Shatin, New Territories

Europe

Belgium
Center for Sexology and Gender Problems at Ghent University Hospital in Ghent.

Netherlands
Center of Expertise on Gender Dysphoria at the University Medical Center of the Vrije Universiteit Amsterdam in Amsterdam.

United Kingdom

England
NHS Gender Identity Development Service of the Tavistock and Portman NHS Foundation Trust in London.

Northern Ireland
Regional Gender Identity Service, Brackenburn Clinic, Belfast Health and Social Care Trust in Belfast
Knowing Our Identity, Belfast Health and Social Care Trust in Belfast

Scotland
Chalmers Gender Identity Clinic, NHS Lothian at Chalmers Hospital in Edinburgh.
Sandyford Gender Identity Clinic, NHS Greater Glasgow and Clyde in Glasgow.
Grampian Gender Identity Clinic, NHS Grampian at Royal Cornhill Hospital in Aberdeen.
Highlands Gender Identity Clinic, NHS Highland at Raigmore Hospital in Inverness.

Wales
Welsh Gender Service, St David’s Hospital in Cardiff.

North America

Canada
Gender Identity Clinic at the Centre for Addiction and Mental Health in Toronto.

United States
Center of Excellence for Transgender Health at the University of San Francisco in San Francisco.
Gender Management Service (GeMS) of Boston Children's Hospital in Boston.
Transgender Health Program of Massachusetts General Hospital in Boston.

See also
Healthcare and the LGBT community
Transgender health care
Gender transitioning

References

Clinics
Gender transitioning and medicine